Sitarail is a private company that has the concession to operate railway lines formerly operated by the government. Countries include:
 Ivory Coast and Burkina Faso
 Cameroon

Sitarail is part of the Bolloré group.

Timeline

2016 

 Operations were severely affected in September 2016 by the partial collapse of the Nzi River Bridge, near Dimbokro. The bridge was repaired in 15 days.
 Under Bolloré operatorship Sitarail have acquired
 4 × GT26CU-3 clones NRE CC33201-CC33204
 4 × GT26CU-3 clones NRE CC33205-CC33208 (contract built by TZV Gredelj in Croatia)
 Grindrod Locomotives are Currently delivering 
 5 × 16-645 powered AC/AC units CC33209-CC33213 
 6 × their 700HP shunters (believed to be AC traction)
 Six locomotives of an order for 16 ordered from Grindrod Locomotives for use in IvoryCoast and Burkina Faso. The locomotives are numbered CC33201-CC33216.

See also 
 Bolloré Africa Logistics

References

External links 
 Citarail locomotives

Transport companies of Ivory Coast
Transport companies of Africa